AutomaticLUV is the second studio album by Danny Fernandes. The album features the single, "Automatic" which peaked at #41 on the Canadian Hot 100. It was released on November 2, 2010. The second single "Take Me Away" is peaked at #39 on the Canadian Hot 100.

Track listing

Chart positions

References

2010 albums
Danny Fernandes albums
CP Music Group albums